In shogi, the Kimura joseki (木村定跡) is a joseki for a Bishop Exchange Reclining Silver (Double Static Rook) opening. It was developed by lifetime Meijin Yoshio Kimura.

Development

Basic Diagram

From the first move: 

1. P-76, P-84; 2. P-26, G-32; 3. G-78, P-85; 4. B-77, P-34; 

5. S-88, Bx77+; 6. Sx77, S-42; 7. S-38, S-72; 8. P-46, P-64; 

9. S-47, S-63; 10. P-66, G-52; 11. G-58, K-41; 12. K-68, S-54; 

13. S-56, K-31; 14. K-79, P-14; 15. P-16, P-94; 16. P-96, P-74; 

17. P-36, P-44; 18. N-37, N-73; 19. P-25, S-33 (Diagram 2). 

From here, it'll go later with K-88, K-22 (Diagram 1), and hostilities will start with Black's pushing and sacrificing the pawn at the 4th file with P-45.

Intermediate Diagram

From Diagram 1, following 20. P-45, Px45, the odds fall on Black with the push of the pawn 21. P-35. From there

21... S-44; 22. P-75, Px75; 23. P-15, Px15; P-24, Px24; 24. Rx24, P*23;

25. R-28, B*63; 26. P*13, Lx13; 27. N-25 (Diagram 3), L-14; 28. Px34, P-24; 

29. Nx33+, Nx33; 30. Rx24, G-23; 31. B*11, K-32; 32. Px33+, Sx33;

33. N*44, Sx44; 34. Rx23+, Kx23; 35. Bx44+ (Diagram 4)

Leading in prototypical fashion to resignation.  Even if White goes from Diagram 2 with 19. ...G-43, White won't be able to break free following 20. S-45, G-44, and then 21. Sx44.

Resign Diagram

See also

 Bishop Exchange
 Bishop Exchange Reclining Silver
 Reclining Silver
 Static Rook

Bibliography

『新版 角換わり腰掛け銀研究』

External links 

 Yet Another Shogi Site: Normal Bishop Exchange: Double Reclining Silver: Kimura's Joseki

Shogi openings
Bishop Exchange openings